Vera Mildred Burridge Baits (1892–1963) was a member of the Board of Regents for the University of Michigan from 1943-1958.

Early life and education
Vera Mildred Burridge was born in Detroit, Michigan on May 15, 1892 to George and Ellen (Roe) Burridge. Burridge earned her Bachelor of Arts degree from the University of Michigan in 1915  in addition to a Teachers' Certificate that same year. While at the University of Michigan she was a member of the Delta Gamma sorority, Mortar Board and the Women's Editor of The Michigan Daily. Burridge also attended Graduate School at the University of Chicago, 1916-1917.

Work
Prior to marrying Stuart Baits, Burridge used her teaching degree to teach school for one year in the Ironwood, Michigan school district, two years of teaching English at the Riverside-Brookfield High School in Riverside, Illinois in addition to teaching English for two years at Northeastern High School in the Detroit Public Schools system. She also spent a summer writing for the old Chicago Record-Herald.

Organizational Leadership
Baits was very active in volunteer organizations. Her first membership was in the Detroit Association of University of women, beginning in 1918. She served as their President, as delegate to the Alumnae Council for five years and a member of the Alumni Advisory Council. For two years she was a member of the Board of Governors of Alumnae House and for four years served on the Board of Governors for Martha Cook Building residence.  Baits was also civic minded, serving as Chairman of Metropolitan Education Committee, the Detroit Young Women's Christian Association (4 years), Chairman of Central Branch, Detroit Young Women's Christian Association (YWCA),and Member of Speakers' Bureau, Detroit chapter of American Red Cross. She was also active in cultural activities in  her community of Grosse Pointe.

UM Regent
Baits was the second woman to be appointed a Regent, May 14, 1943, by Governor Harry Kelly to fill the unexpired term of the late Franklin M. Cook. In 1949 she was elected on the Republican ticket to an eight-year term ending on December 31, 1957. Baits brought to the Regency leadership for the cause of higher education and leadership among the alumnae of the university.

Awards
Baits was awarded the Distinguished Alumni Service Award of the University of Michigan, June 13, 1959 for her efforts on behalf of Higher Education and he contributions as a Regent of the University.
Baits I & Baits II Houses  were opened in the Fall of 1966 in order to fulfill the needs of upper class and graduate students.

University of Michigan Alumnae Club of Grosse Pointe established a four-year tuition scholarship in memory of Mrs. Baits.

Personal life
Burridge married Stuart Gordon Baits 1914 B.E.E. of Hudson Motor Car Company in 1919. They had two children: Jane (Mrs. Robert Gordon Shedd) A.B. 1942, and Stephen Stuart BSE (M.E.)1950.

References

1892 births
1963 deaths
Regents of the University of Michigan
University of Michigan alumni
The Michigan Daily alumni
20th-century American academics